parts 
Cyperus kyllingiella is a species of sedge that is native to parts of the Indian subcontinent and tropical and southern parts of Africa.

See also 
 List of Cyperus species

References 

kyllingiella
Plants described in 2011
Flora of India
Flora of Angola
Flora of Kenya
Flora of Bangladesh
Flora of Botswana
Flora of Burkina Faso
Flora of Chad
Flora of Ethiopia
Flora of Ghana
Flora of Guinea
Flora of Mali
Flora of Malawi
Flora of Mozambique
Flora of Namibia
Flora of Niger
Flora of Nigeria
Flora of Senegal
Flora of Sudan
Flora of Tanzania
Flora of Uganda
Flora of Zambia
Flora of Zimbabwe
Flora of the Democratic Republic of the Congo